Speed sailing records are sanctioned, since 1972, by the World Sailing Speed Record Council (WSSRC). Records are measured either by average speed over a specified distance or by total distance traveled during a specified time interval. The three most sought after records are the: 
 500 metre (or "outright") record is held by Paul Larsen. On 24 November 2012 he sailed the Vestas Sailrocket 2 at 65.45 knots in Walvis Bay, Namibia.
 Nautical mile record is held by Paul Larsen. On 18 November 2012 he sailed the Vestas Sailrocket 2 at 55.32 knots in Walvis Bay, Namibia.
 24 Hour distance record is held by Pascal Bidégorry. On 1 August 2009 he sailed the Banque Populaire V 908 nautical miles (at 37.84 knots). This was while he was breaking the northern Atlantic record.

500 metre records

Class records 

Last updated: 19 November 2012.

Nautical mile records

Day's run 
A Day's run is the distance traveled by a vessel in one day, normally measured from noon to noon. This was the traditional measure used in the days of packet and clipper ships and varied in the actual time dependent on whether the vessel was sailing east or west. The records certified by the WSSRC since 1994 are based on a 24-hour distance measure irrespective of longitude.

24 hour distance record

Note that the nineteenth century records are not strictly compatible as they measure a "Day's run" which was measured noon to noon regardless of longitude. The two entries above were both eastbound and therefore less than 24 hours.

Notable performances 
During her Jules Verne Trophy record in 2011-2012, the Banque Populaire V skippered by Loïck Peyron covered 811.70 nautical miles in 24 hours on 3 December 2011 at 11:45 UT, posting 28 days over 600 miles, including 9 days over 700 miles and 1 day over 800 miles.

During her Jules-Verne trophy record in 2009-2010, the trimaran Groupama 3 skippered by Franck Cammas covered 798 nautical miles in 24 hours on 13 February 2010 at 5 p.m. UT, showing 17 days over 600 miles, including 10 days over 700 miles.

During her Jules-Verne trophy record in 2016-2017, the trimaran  Idec sport in the hands of Francis Joyon and his crew of Clément Surtel, Alex Pella, Bernard Stamm, Gwénolé Gahinet and Sébastien Audigane, covered 894 nautical miles in 24 hours, and 10 consecutive days at 809 miles / 24 h. Francis Joyon rounds Cape Horn, 16 days after riding off of South America, and after a course of nearly 12,000 miles above an average of 30 knots (730.16 miles / 24 h over 16 days). He then signs a performance increase of between 30 and 40% compared to the record to be broken by Loïck Peyron 5 years earlier. Leaving the southern seas with a lead of 4 j 06 h 35 min over Loïck Peyron's previous record, Francis Joyon, Clément Surtel, Alex Pella, Bernard Stamm, Gwénolé Gahinet and Sébastien Audigane regained the equivalent of 2,800 miles on the record during this episode.

During the aborted attempt of 2019, Yann Guichard sets a new record crossing the equator in 4 days 19 h 57 min and, thanks to favorable weather conditions, lines up 4,812.1 miles from the 11th to 16th day, or 802 miles / day for 6 consecutive days.

24 hour distance record for Armel Le Cléac'h on Banque Populaire VII: 682,85 miles in 24 hours singlehanded on 2014 January 26th (28,45 knots).

During his record around the world Singlehanded in 2017, 24 hour distance record for François Gabart on Macif: 850,68 miles in 24h.

During his attempt for the Jules Verne Trophy, December 5th of 2020, Thomas Coville on Sodebo Ultim 3 covered 889.9 miles in 24 hours (37.1 knots average).

During the return trip after his victory in the 2021 Transat Jacques-Vabre, Charles Caudrelier broke two unofficial records on the Maxi Edmond de Rothschild: in false solo training, he reached 50.7 knots, and covered 880 miles in 24 hours at an average speed of 36.6 knots. This last record cannot be approved for a lack of adequate equipment on board.

Instantaneous speed record 

The idea of an instantaneous speed record is not officially sanctioned by the WSSRC and is, therefore, not officially measured or documented. The highest speed ever reported is from the crew of Vestas Sailrocket 2 : on 24 November 2012 they recorded a top speed of 68.33 knots in a 25–29-knot wind.

Previously, the highest speed ever reported was from the crew of l'Hydroptère. During an attempt on 21 December 2008 at Port-Saint-Louis-du-Rhône, they recorded a top speed of approximately 61 knots (speed not verified or registered on any onboard instrumentation) during a 45 knot gust of wind. This heavy gust of wind overpowered the sailboat, causing it to capsize at high speed. The crew sustained only minor injuries.

"Sovereign of the Seas", 1852, 258 ft, the fastest and longest ship yet built when she was launched in New York, designed and built by Donald Mackay, America's foremost clipper designer. On her maiden voyage, she sailed New York to San Francisco in 103 days. This ship achieved the fastest ever recorded speed of a sailing vessel (22 knots).

Notable people
Farrel O'Shea (born 1963), former professional windsurfer

Notes

See also 
World Sailing Speed Record Council
Speed sailing
Transatlantic sailing record

External links and references 
 records on 500m on the World Sailing Speed Record Council site
 records on 1 nautical mile on the World Sailing Speed Record Council site
L'Hydroptère record at 51,36 knots, 4 September 2009, on Youtube
L'Hydroptère site
Vestas Sailrocket site
Macquarie Innovation site
Banque Populaire V site
Crossbow I and II on the Dave Culp SpeedSailing site

Sailing records